The 1991–92 season was the 81st season in Hajduk Split’s history and their first in the Prva HNL.

In autumn 1991, Hajduk was played only European and friendly matches, as the domestic competitions were postponed to the spring 1992 due to the Croatian War of Independence.

Competitions

Overall record

Prva HNL

Classification

Results summary

Results by round

Results by opponent

Source: 1992 Croatian First Football League article

Matches

Prva HNL

Source: hajduk.hr

Croatian Football Cup

Source: hajduk.hr

In 1991

Cup Winners' Cup

Source: hajduk.hr

Player seasonal records

Top scorers

Source: Competitive matches

See also
1992 Croatian First Football League
1992 Croatian Football Cup

References

External sources
 1992 Prva HNL at HRnogomet.com
 1992 Croatian Cup at HRnogomet.com
 1991–92 European Cup Winners' Cup at rsssf.com

1992
Hajduk Split
Hajduk Split
Croatian football championship-winning seasons